James E. Wilson (July 31, 1937 – July 10, 2005) was a Canadian politician. He served in the Legislative Assembly of New Brunswick as a Liberal member from the constituency of Fredericton North.

References

1937 births
2005 deaths
New Brunswick Liberal Association MLAs
Politicians from Fredericton